Piperhill is a village, located four miles south of Nairn in Nairnshire, Scottish Highlands and is in the Scottish council area of Highland.

Populated places in the County of Nairn